Lagro Township is one of seven townships in Wabash County, Indiana, United States. As of the 2010 census, its population was 2,894 and it contained 1,214 housing units.

History
The Hominy Ridge Shelter House and Hopewell Methodist Episcopal Church and Cemetery are listed on the National Register of Historic Places.

Geography

Cities, towns, villages
 Lagro

Unincorporated towns
 Lincolnville at 
 Speicherville at 
(This list is based on USGS data and may include former settlements.)

Adjacent townships
 Chester Township (north)
 Warren Township, Huntington County (northeast)
 Dallas Township, Huntington County (east)
 Polk Township, Huntington County (southeast)
 Wayne Township, Huntington County (southeast)
 Liberty Township (south)
 Noble Township (west)
 Paw Paw Township (northwest)

Cemeteries
The township contains these seven cemeteries: Center Grove, Foster, Independent Order of Odd Fellows, Leedy, Renicker, Saint Patrick and Speicher.

Rivers
 Salamonie River
 Wabash River

Lakes
 Hominy Ridge Lake

School districts
 Metropolitan School District of Wabash County Schools

Political districts
 Indiana's 5th congressional district
 State House District 22
 State Senate District 17

References
 United States Census Bureau 2007 TIGER/Line Shapefiles
 United States Board on Geographic Names (GNIS)
 IndianaMap

External links
 Indiana Township Association
 United Township Association of Indiana

Townships in Wabash County, Indiana
Townships in Indiana